This is a list of films produced in Cinema of Odisha in the Odia language.

1936–1959
 List of Ollywood films of 1936
 List of Ollywood films of 1949
 List of Ollywood films of 1950
 List of Ollywood films of 1951
 List of Ollywood films of 1953
 List of Ollywood films of 1954
 List of Ollywood films of 1956
 List of Ollywood films of 1959

1960s
 List of Ollywood films of 1960
 List of Ollywood films of 1961
 List of Ollywood films of 1962
 List of Ollywood films of 1963
 List of Ollywood films of 1964
 List of Ollywood films of 1965
 List of Ollywood films of 1966
 List of Ollywood films of 1967
 List of Ollywood films of 1968
 List of Ollywood films of 1969

1970s
 List of Ollywood films of 1970
 List of Ollywood films of 1971
 List of Ollywood films of 1972
 List of Ollywood films of 1973
 List of Ollywood films of 1974
 List of Ollywood films of 1975
 List of Ollywood films of 1976
 List of Ollywood films of 1977
 List of Ollywood films of 1978
 List of Ollywood films of 1979

1980s
 List of Ollywood films of 1980
 List of Ollywood films of 1981
 List of Ollywood films of 1982
 List of Ollywood films of 1983
 List of Ollywood films of 1984
 List of Ollywood films of 1985
 List of Ollywood films of 1986
 List of Ollywood films of 1987
 List of Ollywood films of 1988
 List of Ollywood films of 1989

1990s
 List of Ollywood films of 1990
 List of Ollywood films of 1991
 List of Ollywood films of 1992
 List of Ollywood films of 1993
 List of Ollywood films of 1994
 List of Ollywood films of 1995
 List of Ollywood films of 1996
 List of Ollywood films of 1997
 List of Ollywood films of 1998
 List of Ollywood films of 1999

2000s
 List of Ollywood films of 2000
 List of Ollywood films of 2001
 List of Ollywood films of 2002
 List of Ollywood films of 2003
 List of Ollywood films of 2004
 List of Ollywood films of 2005
 List of Ollywood films of 2006
 List of Ollywood films of 2007
 List of Ollywood films of 2008
 List of Ollywood films of 2009

2010s
 List of Odia films of 2010
 List of Odia films of 2011
 List of Odia films of 2012
 List of Odia films of 2013
 List of Odia films of 2014
 List of Odia films of 2015
 List of Odia films of 2016
 List of Odia films of 2017
 List of Odia films of 2018
 List of Odia films of 2019

2020s
 List of Odia films of 2020
 List of Odia films of 2021
 List of Odia films of 2022
 List of Odia films of 2023

References

 *
Odisha-related lists
Cinema of Odisha
Lists of films by language